McKee is a surname of Scottish or Irish origin. The surname is derived from the Gaelic Mac Aodha ("son of Aodh") a patronymic form of an old Gaelic personal name which means "fire". Similar surnames which also are derived from the same Gaelic patronymic are McCoy, McGee, Kee and McKay. Notable people with the surname include:

 Alexander McKee (c. 1735 – 1799), British Indian Department agent (in North America) and colonel 
 Alexander McKee (author) (1918–1992), British journalist, military historian and diver
 Andrew McKee (disambiguation)
 Ann McKee, neurologist and neuropathologist 
 Arthur McKee, New Zealand newspaper proprietor, photo-engraver and printer 
 Ben McKee (born 1985), American bassist for the band, Imagine Dragons
 Billy McKee (born 1921), Irish republican, a founding member and former leader of the Provisional Irish Republican Army
 Bonnie McKee (born 1984), American singer and songwriter
 Charles McKee (born 1962), American sailor and Olympic bronze medalist
 Christopher McKee (born 1942), astrophysicist
 Daniel McKee (born 1951), Governor of Rhode Island
 Darrell McKee (born c. 1963), Canadian curler
 Dave McKee (died 2005), Australian politician
 David McKee (1935–2022), British writer and illustrator
 Dick McKee (1893–1920), member of the Irish Republican Army (IRA)
 Elsie McKee, theology professor
 Eva McKee (1890–1955), Irish craftswoman and designer
 Frances McKee (born 1966), Scottish singer and songwriter
 Frank McKee (1923–1988), Scottish professional footballer
 Gina McKee (born 1964), English actress
 Grant McKee (Sept. 14, 1940 – Jan. 10, 2018), Canadian Football League player, Grey Cup recipient Hamilton Tiger Cats 1963
 Hugh McKee (1844–1871), American naval officer
 Ivan McKee (born 1963), Scottish politician 
 Jaimes McKee, (born 1987) English-born Hong Kong footballer
 James McKee (footballer), Scottish footballer
 Jay McKee (born 1977), Canadian coach and former professional ice hockey player
 Jerry McKee (born 1946), American basketball player
 John McKee (disambiguation)
 Kayleigh McKee (born 1994), American voice actress
 Kenneth McKee (1906–1991), English orthopaedist, pioneer of hip replacement surgery
 Kevin McKee (disambiguation)
 Kinnaird R. McKee (1929–2013), United States Navy four-star admiral 
 Lonette McKee (born 1954), American actress, composer, producer, screenwriter and director
 Lyra McKee (1990–2019), Northern Irish journalist and author
 Maria McKee (born 1964), American singer-songwriter
 Mary Harrison McKee (1858–1930), only daughter of President Benjamin Harrison and his first wife
 Nicole McKee (born 1971/1972), New Zealand politician
 Paul McKee (disambiguation)
 Redick McKee (1800–1886, American government official
 Robert McKee (born 1941), American author
 Robert A. McKee (born 1949), American politician, former member of the Maryland House of Delegates
 Roger McKee (1926–2014), American Major League Baseball pitcher
 Roxanne McKee, English 21st century actress and model
 Samuel McKee (disambiguation)
 Seth J. McKee (1916–2016), United States Air Force general
 Suzy McKee Charnas (born 1939), American novelist and short story writer
 Theodore McKee (born 1947), chief judge of the United States Court of Appeals for the Third Circuit
 Thom McKee (born 1955), United States Navy officer
 Tim McKee (born 1953), American former swimmer, three-time Olympic silver medalist
 Tom McKee (born 1941), American politician

See also
 McKey (surname)
 Clan MacKay

References

Anglicised Irish-language surnames
Anglicised Scottish Gaelic-language surnames
Scottish surnames
Surnames of British Isles origin
Surnames of Scottish origin
Surnames of Irish origin